Mirari Films was an animation and special effects company based in Los Angeles, with facilities in Brasov, Romania and New York City. In 2022, the studio closed down then the employees moved to any other animation faculties (including Bento Box Entertainment and Titmouse, Inc.).

Filmography

TV shows

Shorts
 Cute Attack (2010)
 The Mooch

External links
 

American animation studios
American companies established in 1999
American companies disestablished in 2022
Film production companies of the United States
Television production companies of the United States